"Special Lady" is a 1980 single by vocal trio Ray, Goodman & Brown, formerly known as The Moments. In the U.S., it was a number one R&B hit and reached number five on the Billboard Hot 100 in 1980. The single marked their first release under the name Ray, Goodman & Brown.  The song was written by Harry Ray, Al Goodman and Lee Walter and produced by Vincent Castellano.

Charts

Weekly charts

Year-end charts

See also
List of number-one R&B singles of 1980 (U.S.)

References

1979 songs
1980 singles
The Moments songs
Polydor Records singles